Showbiz and A.G. (also shortened as Show and AG) is an American hip hop duo from The Bronx borough of New York City, composed of record producer Rodney "Showbiz" Lemay (born July 7, 1969) and rapper Andre "A.G." Barnes (born September 26, 1970). The duo formed soon after their debut on the song "Back to Back Rhyming" from Lord Finesse's Funky Technician album and joined the hip hop collective D.I.T.C. along with Lord Finesse, Diamond D, Fat Joe, O.C., Buckwild and Big L.

Career

1990s
The duo's first release was an extended play Soul Clap, self-released in late 1991 via their own independent record label, Showbiz Records. The EP included a song "Diggin' in the Crates" with verses from Diamond D and Lord Finesse, which became the name of a bigger group called D.I.T.C. They signed with Payday/London Records and re-released the EP on March 17, 1992 as "Party Groove"/"Soul Clap" (also known as Showbiz & A.G.). On September 22, 1992, the duo released their debut studio album, Runaway Slave, with guest appearances from Diamond D, Lord Finesse, Dres, and the first album appearance of Big L. In 1993, Showbiz became popular for producing KRS-One's single "Sound of da Police".

In 1994, Showbiz and A.G. had a guest spot on Black Sheep's second album Non-Fiction, on the track "E.F.F.E.C.T.". Showbiz soon shortened his name to Show, changing the group name to 'Show & A.G.'. 1995 saw the release of their second studio album, Goodfellas, which featured a darker sound than their debut, as well as the absence of Showbiz rapping. It featured contributions from artists who were on Runaway Slave, plus the Ghetto Dwellas (D Flow and Party Arty), Big Cathy, Roc Raida, Method Man, Wali World and DJ Premier. The most successful song from the album was DJ Premier's 'Nyte Time' remix of the track "Next Level", an instrumental version of which was later featured in the 2002 film 8 Mile.

Following the release of EP-turned-LP Full Scale project in 1998, the duo began concentrating on their work with D.I.T.C., as well as solo projects. In 1999, the duo appeared on A.G.'s first solo studio album, The Dirty Version, which also featured contributions from 7 out of 8 D.I.T.C. members (Big L was the only absent member due to being murdered on February 15 later same year), as well as the Ghetto Dwellas, Gang Starr, KRS-One and Big Pun. Showbiz was one of the executive producers on D.I.T.C.'s self-titled group album, which was released in 2000 via Tommy Boy Records.

2000s
After a hiatus between the release of the D.I.T.C.'s 2001 Wild Life EP and 2005, Show released his first solo album D.I.T.C. Presents Street Talk in November 2005. The album featured 18 new tracks performed by the likes of O.C., Party Arty, Milano, Fat Joe, Sean Price, and late Big Pun and Big L over Show's productions. It also saw A.G. and Show reunite as A.G. was featured on 2 of the album's songs, "Chase Game" and "You Ain't a Killer". A.G.'s second solo album titled Get Dirty Radio was released October 31, 2006 through Look Records, which featured a Show-produced song "The Struggle". In 2007, they released a new EP entitled Live Hard on D.I.T.C. Records, their first new material in nearly a decade. Showbiz teamed up with fellow producer Eric "E-Blaze" Blaze forming a production duo Born Lords. Following 2008's D.I.T.C.'s compilation album The Movement, members O.C. and A.G. released a collaborative album called Oasis in 2009, which also featured production from Born Lords.

2010s 
Following the deaths of fellow artists Big L (1999), Party Arty (2008) and Roc Raida (2009), A.G. joined his protégé duo 950 Plus to release a mixtape The 25th Hour in 2010. Later that same year he released an album titled Everything's Berri and co-founded a small label Red Apples 45 with Ray West. In 2011, Showbiz teamed up with KRS-One for Godsville album. On September 9, 2012, Show and AG released the album Mugshot Music, and in 2017, they released the EP Take It Back.

Discography

Studio albums

Extended plays

References

External links
Interview with Show (2007)
A.G. DITC Myspace site
A.G. on Red Apples Forty-Five
Hip Hop Icon Series: A.G.

African-American musical groups
American hip hop record producers
American musical duos
Diggin' in the Crates Crew members
Five percenters
Hip hop duos
Hip hop groups from New York City
Rappers from the Bronx
Record producers from New York (state)
FFRR Records artists
PolyGram artists
1969 births
1970 births

Living people